The Okelousa are Native American people originally  from the Southern United States (Louisiana and Mississippi). The name is taken from the Chocktaw word for "black water"

External links

Louisiana Tribe Index
Louisiana Indian Tribes

Indigenous peoples of the Southeastern Woodlands
Native American tribes in Louisiana
Native American tribes in Mississippi